The 1996 SCCA Pro Racing World Challenge season was the seventh running of the Sports Car Club of America's World Challenge series. It was the final season before a thirteen-year-long rivalry in touring car between BMW, Mazda, and Acura. This was ended in 2010 with the adoption of a new touring car class, moving the older touring cars to a new "GTS" group. It was also the final combined class year until 2010. This was also the final season with more than two classes until 2010. It was the first season with more than three classes since 1992. Eagle got its final wins after being a major competitor in the series since the beginning. The brand was discontinued only a few years later. Also getting its final wins was the Oldsmobile brand, having also been competitive for several years. A notable entry was the Mosler Intruder, a supercar which was never seen again after 1996.

All but the final two races had S1, S2, T1, and T2 groups (S for sport and T for touring). For the races at Reno and Sears Point, a "GTA" group was added.

Results

References

GT World Challenge America